Macedônia is a municipality (município) in the Brazilian state of São Paulo. The population is 3,692 (2020 est.) in an area of 328 km². Its elevation is 502 m.

Etymology 
Municipality's name has derived from the ancient Kingdom of Macedonia, of the same name.

References

Municipalities in São Paulo (state)